Mustafa Mashhur (15 September 1921 – 29 October 2002) was the fifth General Guide (leader) of the Egyptian Muslim Brotherhood. He was the official head of the Muslim Brotherhood organization from 1996 until 2002, although outside observers have suggested that he informally ran the organization during the ten-year term of his predecessor Muhammad Hamid Abu al-Nasr as well.

In 1995, Mashhur published “Jihad Is The Way”, the last of a five-volume work titled “The Laws of Da’wa.”  Da’wa means to “summon” others to Islam, essentially a form of proselytizing to non-Muslims. “Jihad Is The Way” detailed Mashhur’s views as to how the Muslim Brotherhood determined to advance Islam's global conquest, to reestablish an Islamic Caliphate, and to infuse all Muslims with a sense of duty to wage jihad (battle) against Israel.

Mashhur died on 29 October 2002 and he was succeeded by Ma'mun al-Hudaybi, who was the son of Hassan al-Hudaybi, the second General Guide of the Muslim Brotherhood.

References

1921 births
2002 deaths
Egyptian Muslim Brotherhood leaders
People from Sharqia Governorate